Lonsdale is an industrial suburb south of Adelaide, South Australia, within the City of Onkaparinga.

Lonsdale was farmed from shortly after European settlement until the 1950s, when the South Australian Housing Trust acquired much of the land for industrial use. Mobil's Port Stanvac Refinery and Chrysler's engine foundry were followed by many other manufacturing and service industries. Subsequent suburban development of surrounding areas has driven demand for a wide range of service-oriented businesses in the area.

Port Stanvac Refinery and the Mitsubishi (formerly Chrysler) engine plant closed in 2004, with both sites remaining unused as of 2007.  The South Australian Government announced plans to build a seawater desalination plant at the site in 2007, to provide fresh water for Adelaide. The Adelaide Desalination Plant opened in 2013.

Transport 

Lonsdale is served by Lonsdale railway station. Lonsdale has SouthLink's largest southern bus depot.

History
Lonsdale was settled in the early 1840s in the movement of colonists into the Morphett Vale Region.  One of its settlers had come from the English town of Kirkby Lonsdale. A local farmer gave the name Lonsdale to his property and in time this name was given to a local rail siding and eventually the suburb.

Farming continued in the area until the 1970s. The housing trust had purchased a large amount of land in the vicinity and portions of this were set aside for industrial use, with large firms like Chrysler and Sola Optical as well as the Port Stanvac Oil refinery moving in. Farming in the area had become unprofitable by the 1980s.

See also 
 Rail Car Depot Relocation project - 30 railcars with scope for future expansion.

References

External links 

 Map

Suburbs of Adelaide